New Holland railway station is a single-platform station which serves the village of New Holland in North Lincolnshire, England.

History
At the pier head was situated New Holland Pier railway station. As one of the early aims of the MS&LR was to reach Hull the pierhead at New Holland became its "Up" terminus. This was later changed to Grimsby on completion of the "London Extension" to Marylebone.

Because of these early aims the railway company bought out the rights of the New Holland Ferry. These rights transferred to the Great Central Railway, the London & North Eastern Railway and, on nationalisation, British Railways. The ferry service was closed on the opening of the Humber Bridge in June 1981 and the New Holland Pier railway station closed. The present day railway station at New Holland opened to serve the community, replacing the original which closed on the same day.

New Holland was a railway community, the majority of the housing being built by the company to house its workers. It played an important part in railway life for it was here that the railway company laundry was situated and special laundry vans brought the soiled washing from the company's stations, restaurant cars and hotels. Also centred here were the company's wagon sheet repair shops, skills used in the repair of sails could be put to a railway use.

Yarborough Hotel was rebuilt (replacing a hotel bought in 1845) in 1851 for MS&LR. It was included in adverts for LNER hotels in 1936, but was sold before nationalisation, being advertised for sale in 1947.

Facilities
The station is unstaffed and has limited amenities (just a waiting shelter, bench seat and timetable poster board on the single wood platform).  Tickets have to be purchased in advance or on the train.  Level access is available between the station entrance and platform.

Services
All services at New Holland are operated by East Midlands Railway using Class 156 DMUs.

There is a Sunday service of four trains per day in each direction during the summer months only. There are no winter Sunday services at the station.

Services were previously operated by Northern Trains but transferred to East Midlands Railway as part of the May 2021 timetable changes.

References

External links

Railway stations in the Borough of North Lincolnshire
DfT Category F1 stations
Railway stations opened by British Rail
Railway stations in Great Britain opened in 1981
Railway stations served by East Midlands Railway
Former Northern franchise railway stations